Four on the Outside is an album by trombonist Curtis Fuller which was recorded in September 1978 and released on the Dutch Timeless label.

Reception

Allmusic awarded the album 4 stars noting "While Curtis Fuller may have reached his peak in the 1960s, he continued to be an important voice well into the 1970s and beyond. This delightful set features him in a front line with Pepper Adams, and the trombone-baritone saxophone combination was a natural".

Track listing 
All compositions by Curtis Fuller except as indicated
 "Four on the Outside" - 4:54
 "Suite Kathy" - 13:04
 "Hello, Young Lovers" (Oscar Hammerstein II, Richard Rodgers) - 5:11
 "Little Dreams" - 7:49
 "Ballad for Gabe-Wells" - 8:19
 "Corrida del Torro" - 7:35

Personnel 
Curtis Fuller - trombone
Pepper Adams - baritone saxophone
James Williams - piano 
Dennis Irwin - bass
John Yarling - drums

References 

Curtis Fuller albums
1978 albums
Timeless Records albums